Jessica Mila Agnesia or better known as Jessica Mila (born in Langsa, Nanggroe Aceh Darussalam, Indonesia on August 3, 1992) is a model and actress of mixed Dutch, Minahasan and Javanese descent.

Early life 
Jessica Mila was born in Langsa, Aceh, on 3 August  1992. Her father is Javanese, while her mother is Dutch-Minahasa; she is the youngest daughter of the family and has three brothers. She started her career at a very young age, acting in the tv drama series Cinta SMU on Indosiar in 2002. She is a graduate of SMA Negeri 70 Jakarta, finished college with a Bachelor's degree in Management Entrepreneurship from Binus University in Jakarta.

Filmography 
 Slank Nggak Ada Matinya (2013)
 Marmut Merah Jambu (2014)
 Surga Di Telapak Kaki Ibu (2016)
 Pacarku Anak Koruptor (2016)
 Dubsmash (2016)
 Koala Kumal (2016)
 Jones Jomblo Ngenes (2016)
 Mata Batin (2017)
 Mata Batin 2 (2019)
 Bridezilla (2019)
 Imperfect (2019)

References

External links 
 

1992 births
Living people
Indo people
Javanese people
Indonesian Christians
Indonesian child actresses
Indonesian film actresses
21st-century Indonesian women singers
Minahasa people
Indonesian people of Dutch descent
Indonesian female models
Indonesian television actresses
People from Langsa
Actresses from Aceh